The flamebacks or goldenbacks are large woodpeckers which are resident breeders in tropical southern Asia. They derive their English names from their golden or crimson backs.

However, the two flameback genera Dinopium and Chrysocolaptes are not particularly close relatives. The former are close to the enigmatic Meiglyptes and possibly Hemicircus woodpeckers, and the recently reclassified rufous woodpecker (Micropternus brachyurus). Chrysocolaptes on the other hand appears to be a rather close relative of Campephilus, the genus of the famous ivory-billed woodpecker (C. principalis).

Tribe Malarpicini
Genus Dinopium
 Himalayan flameback, Dinopium shorii
 Common flameback,  Dinopium javanense
Spot-throated flameback, Dinopium everetti
 Black-rumped flameback,  Dinopium benghalense
 Red-backed flameback, Dinopium psarodes

Tribe Megapicini
Genus Chrysocolaptes
 White-naped woodpecker,  Chrysocolaptes festivus
 Greater flameback,  Chrysocolaptes guttacristatus
 Crimson-backed flameback, Chrysocolaptes stricklandi
Javan flameback, Chrysocolaptes strictus
Luzon flameback, Chrysocolaptes haematribon
Yellow-faced flameback, Chrysocolaptes xanthocephalus
Buff-spotted flameback, Chrysocolaptes lucidus
Red-headed flameback, Chrysocolaptes erythrocephalus

Footnotes

References
 

 
 
Bird common names